Carex onoei, also known as needle sedge, is a tussock-forming species of perennial sedge in the family Cyperaceae. It is native to far south eastern parts of Russia, north eastern parts of China, Korea and northern parts of Japan.

See also
List of Carex species

References

onoei
Taxa named by Adrien René Franchet
Taxa named by Ludovic Savatier
Plants described in 1875
Flora of Japan
Flora of Manchuria
Flora of Korea
Flora of China
Flora of Primorsky Krai